Chorizanthe watsonii (kor-i-ZAN-the WAT-son-ee-eye) is a species of flowering plant in the buckwheat family known by the common name Fivetooth Spineflower or Watson's Spineflower. They are an annual herb native to the western United States including Idaho, California, Oregon, Nevada, Utah, Washington and Arizona, namely the Mojave Desert which runs through many of them.

Habitat and Description

It grows in many types of desert plant communities, in areas of sandy to gravelly flats and slopes and mixed grassland including Pinyon-Juniper woodland, Joshua Tree woodland, and sagebrush scrub. The warmer northern Mojave Desert and the cold Great Basin Desert finds them widely distributed at elevations of 300–2400m.

This small plant grows a woolly erect stem up to about 2-15 centimeters tall with leaves 3-20mm in length. The inflorescence is a cluster of flowers surrounded by five hairy greenish to reddish bracts tipped with hooked awns 1–2 mm in length. The flower is 0.5–1 cm in diameter and yellow in color and grow from April/May to July/August in the USA's summer months. Specimens observed in the northern areas of the range, (such as the south-east Washington's Palouse Prairies) usually have three stamens.

References

External links
Jepson Manual Treatment
Photo gallery

watsonii
North American desert flora
Flora of the California desert regions
Flora of the Western United States
Flora of the Southwestern United States
Plants described in 1870
Taxa named by Asa Gray
Taxa named by John Torrey
Flora without expected TNC conservation status